Anamorphidae is a family of beetles in the superfamily Coccinelloidea, formerly included within the family Endomychidae. They are found worldwide. Like enchomyids, they are fungivores, with adult and larval stages thought to exclusively consume fungal spores.

Genera
After
 Aclemmysa Reitter, 1904
 Acritosoma Pakaluk and Slipinski, 1995
 Afralexia Strohecker, 1967
 Anagaricophilus Arrow, 1922
 Anamorphus LeConte, 1878
 Anamycetaea Strohecker, 1975c
 Asymbius Gorham, 1896
 Austroclemmus Strohecker, 1953a
 Baeochelys Strohecker, 1974b
 Bryodryas Strohecker, 1974d
 Bystodes Strohecker, 1953a
 Bystus Guérin-Méneville, 1857
 Catapotia Thomson, 1860
 Clemmus Hampe, 1850
 Coryphus Csiki, 1902b
 Cyrtomychus Kolbe, 1910
 Cysalemma Dajoz, 1970b
 Dexialia Sasaji, 1970
 Dialexia Gorham, 1887–99
 Endocoelus Gorham, 1886
 Erotendomychus Lea, 1922
 Exysma Gorham, 1891
 Exysmodes Dajoz, 1970a
 Geoendomychus Lea, 1922
 Idiophyes Blackburn, 1895
 Loeblia Dajoz, 1972a
 Malagaricophilus Strohecker, 1974d
 Micropsephodes Champion, 1913
 Micropsephus Gorham, 1891
 Mychothenus Strohecker, 1953a
 Papuella Strohecker, 1956a
 Pararhymbus Arrow, 1920b
 Parasymbius Arrow, 1920a
 Rhymbillus Reichensperger, 1915
 Rhymbomicrus Casey, 1916
 Symbiotes Redtenbacher, 1847
Extinct genera and a species of Symbiotes are known from Eocene aged Baltic and Bitterfeld amber.

References

Further reading

 
 
 
 
 
 
 
 
 
 
 

Coccinelloidea
Polyphaga families